Shmil is a village in the Elbasan County, eastern Albania. Following the local government reform of 2015, Shmil became a part of the municipality of Elbasan and is under the municipal unit of Labinot-Mal.

Demographic History
Shmil (Shëmill) is attested in the Ottoman defter of 1467 as a settlement in the vilayet of Çermeniça. It had a total of 42 households represented by the following household heads: Ashtin Dislini, Petër Padisi, Gjergj Malakasi, Gjergj Këpota, Gjergj Gatoni, Gjon Mazhi, Lekë Maxi, Gjergj Kokla, Ilija Shkifata, Gjon Çifuti, Gjon Shqipfata, Lekë Padisi, Gjon Torko, Gjin Martini, Gjergj Barçi, Shogon Kargaçini, Petër Shëmilli, Gjin Barçini, Dom Progoni, Gjin Mazi, Gjergj Mazaraku (Mazreku), Vlash Mirili, Gjon Çkifaton, Gjergj Shokoni, Mekshe Lopësi, Nikolla Shëmilli, Gjergj Korvallani, Martin Ivgjeçi, Gjergj Bobokoni, Gjon Palini, Progoni Ishkurtë (i shkurt, "the short"), Bard Bosini, Gjergj Bulimiri, Nikolla Manesi, Andreja Shëmill Primiqyri, Petër Nestra, Progon Dom Shpani, Tanush Borizini, Nikolla Ishkurtë, Petër Shkifaton, Martin Berbati, and Skljafirini.

References

Villages in Elbasan County